Federal Highway 225 (Carretera Federal 225) is a Federal Highway of Mexico. It runs from Port Chiapas on the Pacific Ocean to the city of Tapachula, Chiapas.

References

225